Madisen Beaty (born February 28, 1995) is an American actress and DJ. As an actress, she is known for her roles as Daisy Fuller in The Curious Case of Benjamin Button (2008), Doris Solstad in The Master (2012), Rebeccah Mulcahey in Other People (2016), Talya Banks in the ABC Family series The Fosters (2013–2018), Iris in The Magicians (2018–2019), and Patricia Krenwinkel in Aquarius (2015–16) and Once Upon a Time in Hollywood (2019).

Life and career
Beaty was born in Centennial, Colorado. In 2008, she made her feature film debut portraying Daisy Fuller in the drama film The Curious Case of Benjamin Button. Beaty portrayed Sara Dougan in 2010 Lifetime movie The Pregnancy Pact, co-starring with Thora Birch. She then guest starred as Leslie in the iCarly episode "iWas a Pageant Girl", and as Kristin Haskell in the NCIS episode "Dead Air". For the latter appearance, she won the Young Artist Award for Best Performance in a TV Series – Guest Starring Young Actress.

In 2012, she appeared as Doris Solstad in The Master, a Paul Thomas Anderson film also starring Philip Seymour Hoffman, Joaquin Phoenix, and Amy Adams. In November 2015, it was announced that Beaty had been cast in a regular role for the second season of NBC's period drama series Aquarius, portraying Patricia Krenwinkel. In 2016, she starred alongside Chad Michael Murray and Luke Wilson in the Western thriller Outlaws and Angels. In 2018, she was cast as the goddess Iris in Syfy's series The Magicians. In 2019, Beaty played a different version of Krenwinkel in Quentin Tarantino's Once Upon a Time in Hollywood.

Beaty DJs under the alias 'MASEN BAY'. She has played at notable spots around Los Angeles, California such as The Skybar, Bar Lubitsch, The Friend and more.

Filmography

Film

Television

References

External links
 
 

1995 births
21st-century American actresses
Actresses from Colorado
American child actresses
American film actresses
American television actresses
Living people
People from Centennial, Colorado